Tetiana Nakazna (born 6 August 1972) is a Ukrainian modern pentathlete. She competed in the women's individual event at the 2000 Summer Olympics.

References

1972 births
Living people
Ukrainian female modern pentathletes
Olympic modern pentathletes of Ukraine
Modern pentathletes at the 2000 Summer Olympics
Place of birth missing (living people)